Superfly or Super fly may refer to:

Film and music
Super Fly (1972 film), a blaxploitation film
Super Fly (soundtrack), a 1972 Curtis Mayfield soundtrack to the film
"Superfly" (song), the album's title track
Armour of God II: Operation Condor, a 1991 Hong Kong film released in the Philippines as Superfly
Superfly (2018 film), a remake of the 1972 blaxploitation film
Superfly (soundtrack), a soundtrack album from the 2018 film
"Super Fly" (Giant Panda song), a 2005 single by Giant Panda
"Superfly", a song by 4 Non Blondes on their only album Bigger, Better, Faster, More!
"Superfly", a song on The O.C. Supertones' sixth album Hi-Fi Revival
"Superfly 2018", a Hardbass song by DJ Blyatman
Superfly (band) (born 1984), Japanese rock unit, formerly a duo
Superfly (Superfly album), the rock unit's debut self-titled album

People
"Superfly" Frank Lucas (drug dealer) (1930–2019), Harlem crime figure and inspiration for the film American Gangster
"Superfly" Jimmy Snuka (1943–2017), Fijian professional wrestler
Super Fly (wrestler) (born 1987), Mexican professional wrestler

Other uses
Superfly (company), a marketing company in the United States
Super flyweight, a weight division in professional boxing
Superfly (boxing), a 2017–2018 series of super flyweight boxing cards
MX Superfly, a motorcross racing game released in 2002
Superfly, a recurring character in the Joe Cartoon franchise
Superfly Johnson, a character from the failed video game Daikatana
Nike Mercurial Vapor Superfly, a football boot